List of United States dialysis providers:

 American Renal Associates
 American Renal Care
 Abramson Center for Jewish Life
 DaVita Inc.
 Diversified Specialty Institute Holdings, Inc.
 Dialysis Clinic, Inc
 Fresenius Medical Care
 Holy Cross Renal Center
 Legacy Dialysis
 National Renal Care
 Northwest Kidney Centers
 Olympus Dialysis
 Premier Dialysis
 Sanderling Renal Services
 Satellite Healthcare
 US Renal Care

 
Dialysis providers